Bone (also Boni, or Bone Saoraja) was a sultanate in the south-west peninsula of what is now Sulawesi (formerly Celebes), a province of modern-day Indonesia. It came under Dutch rule in 1905, and was succeeded by the Bone Regency.

History
Bone was an adat-based Bugis kingdom whose origins can be traced back to the early 15th century. Its chronicle (as yet unpublished) provides detailed information on its rulers, starting from La Umasa, who ruled in the early 15th century, through to La Tenrtatta, who died in 1699. Under La Umasa and his nephew La Saliu (Kerrépelua) who succeeded him, Bone expanded from a handful of settlements around the modern capital Watampone to a small kingdom roughly one-third the size of kabupaten Bone. 

In the early 16th century the kingdom expanded northwards, fighting with Luwu for control of the mouth of the River Cenrana, a major east coast trade exit. In 1582 Bone entered an alliance with the Wajo and Soppeng kingdoms for mutual defence against the rising power of Gowa-Tallo. This alliance became known as Tellumpocco'e ( the Three Summits) or LaMumpatue Ri Timurung ( The burying of the stones at Timurung).

In 1611, during the reign of the tenth king of Bone We Tenrituppu MatinroE ri Sidenreng, Bone was invaded by the Sultanate of Gowa and pressured to convert to Islam. Bone State later enjoyed a period of prosperity in the middle of the 17th century.

Bone became the most powerful state of South Sulawesi under Arung (ruler of) Palakka, La Tenritatta (1634 or 1635 – 1696) who sided with the Dutch admiral Cornelis Speelman against the Makasar kingdom of Goa-Tallo, which led to the defeat and capture of Makassar in 1669. From this year until 1814 when the British temporarily gained power of the region, Bone was by treaty and in practice the overlord of South Sulawesi, with the exception of Dutch-controlled areas on the west and south coast, including the important port-city of Makassar. When the Dutch returned to Makassar in 1816 they attempted to reduce Bone's status from equal to vassal, a move strongly resisted by Bone's rulers. 

Following a military defeat during the South Sulawesi expeditions of 1905, the Bone State lost its independence to the Dutch.

In May 1950, the people held demonstrations in Watampone against the royalty and Bone's membership in the State of East Indonesia. This caused the sultan to join Indonesia.

List of rulers

See also
 Dutch–Bone wars

Citations

References
 For the wars in Boni, see Perelaer, De Bonische Expedition, 1859 (Leiden, 1872) ; and Meyers, in the Militaire Spectator (1880).

Further reading
 

Precolonial states of Indonesia
Former sultanates
History of Sulawesi